Arkansas City High School is a public high school in Arkansas City, Kansas, United States. It is operated by Arkansas City USD 470 school district. Similar to the nickname for the city, the high school is usually referred to as “Ark City”.

History

During the early days of many new communities, church buildings were used for multiple purposes until other facilities could be built.  On June 4, 1880, the first Arkansas City High School graduating class had its commencement at the First United Methodist Church. The district rented space in a former boarding house owned by H. P. Farrar in the period 1888 to 1891 to use for high school classes. The building got the nickname "Bed Bug Hall" due to the discovery of the pests.

From September 7, 1892 to 1922, high school classes were held in what is now known as Old Arkansas City High School. In 1893 the principal was L. E. Eddy and there were a total of three faculty. Cowley Community College was established in 1922 as the Arkansas City Junior College and, for thirty years, its facilities were in the basement of the Old Arkansas City High School building, one of the oldest remaining buildings in Arkansas City. It is listed on the National Register of Historic Places as "Old Arkansas City High School" and is Cowley College's Ireland Hall.

In 1922, students moved to a "new" high school.

Athletics
The first athletic activities were a girls' basketball team organized by chemistry and physics teacher Roxana Oldroyd. In 1906 the boys' basketball team was created.

The tennis team and softball team have won several state championships. Arkansas City native Darren Daulton played fourteen seasons with the Philadelphia Phillies, in one of which they won the 1993 National League pennant, and three with the Florida Marlins, with whom he won the 1997 World Series. He was inducted into the Kansas Sports Hall of Fame in 2006. Quarterback Jack Mitchell was an All-American in 1948 and the MVP of the 1949 Sugar Bowl.

Notable alumni
 Darren Daulton (1962–2017), baseball player for the Philadelphia Phillies and Florida Marlins.
 Frank Davis (1905–1987), writer and poet.
 Howard Engleman (1919–2011), college basketball player for University of Kansas from 1939 to 1941
 Scott Taylor (born 1966), professional baseball player
 Louis Weller, pro football player
 Monroe Work (1866–1945), Sociologist and historian.

See also
 List of high schools in Kansas
 List of unified school districts in Kansas

References

External links
 Arkansas City High School

Public high schools in Kansas
Education in Cowley County, Kansas
1891 establishments in Kansas